Elippathayam (Translation: The Rat Trap) is a 1981 Malayalam film written and directed by Adoor Gopalakrishnan. It stars Karamana Janardanan Nair, Sharada, Jalaja, and Rajam K. Nair. The  film documents the feudal life in Kerala at its twilight overshadowed with grief, and a sense of carelessness/avoidance as a form of revolt. The protagonist is disenfranchised and trapped within himself and does not want to - unable to change with the social changes taking place around him. The film premiered at the 1982 Cannes Film Festival. It was also screened at the London Film Festival where it won the Sutherland Trophy. It is widely regarded as one of the best Indian films ever made.

Plot
A middle-aged man Unni and his two sisters live in an ancient tharavadu (manor) in Kerala. They struggle as the traditional feudal way of life becomes untenable. Eventually, succumbing to the adverse conditions surrounding him, Unni becomes entrapped in his attitudes & ways, helpless like a rat in a trap. The movie's title 'Rat Trap' is a metaphor for a state of oblivion to changes in the external world, such as the disintegration of the feudal system in which some are caught leading to irrelevance & destruction.

The film is set in the now derelict manor house of an aristocratic family, that has obviously seen better days. The film begins by showing the audience about a rat problem, and Sridevi taking initiative to catch and drown rats in the house. Unni, the patriarch, in spite of the looming changes in the family's fortune and the times, retains the old attitudes and is portrayed as proud, and incapable of adjusting to the impending downfall of his family and remains oblivious to it. He also does not seem to have any masculine, authoritative characteristics of a feudal patriarch. He is seen spending most of his day in idleness and sleeping. His only activities are reading the newspaper and oiling himself. He is taken care by his sisters and an old agriculture partner & neighbor, Scaria Mappila. His sisters cook, clean, and do all the household chores for him. He seems careless about wanting to get his sisters married, and selfish in order to keep his support system in place. The Mappila handles all the financial aspects for Unni following ancient ways. Unni is scared and not bothered when thieves steal crops from his land, even when his younger sister is in a premarital relationship, or if his sister's son steals from him or might be sleeping with a prostitute. He does not stand up for himself or for the family, and not ready to face the taunts or the threats of his extended family and the villagers.

The middle sister Rajamma is destroyed by the silence of her brother, who does not support her when marriage proposals are brought to him, turning down an offer when he feels it was beneath his family's standards - and remains silent & unable to act while she is ailing, and she eventually dies. The younger sister is unconcerned and elopes without informing anyone. The eldest sister comes in for her share of property but leaves without none, and sends summons through courts. Unni is left alone in the mansion and ends up without support and lives isolated in the dark corners of his room. He does not respond to anyone. In the end some people enter in his house, and he runs out in fear, hits his head and becomes unconscious. They carry him to the pond where Sridevi used to drown rats and throws him in, and he is seen walking out of the pond scared and cold. The people could either be robbers or his brother in law who came to forcefully takeover his property.

Themes and analysis
Gopalakrishnan says in his interview that the movie was inspired by the feudal characteristics of his own family. Silence is a huge trope in the movie, with large swathes of silence in dialogue. The chief theme of the film, according to Gopalakrishnan, is Unni's obliviousness to external realities and how conflict of his worldview creates dysfunctional life for him. The character's mental health is closely compared to of the character in Anton Chekov's Ward No. 6.

Gopalakrishnan makes use of colors, palettes, and shades in the film to convey themes. Rajamma the middle sister wears blue. Gopalakrishnan said he gave her blue to show her gentleness, submissiveness, and being doomed. She is incapable of imagining how to chart her life outside the patriarchy. She is shown to be submissive, constantly working for others and faithfully looking after her older brother Unni.

The eldest sister wears green according to Gopalakrishnan to show earthiness, practicality and intelligence - she has survived within the patriarchy by marriage and bearing children. She worries about wealth and how to hold her power in her husband's family, and her main concern is to claim her share of the family property and income. She is portrayed as intransigent, protective of her children, and as self-centered as her brother.

The youngest sister, Sridevi wears red, which Gopalakrishnan says is to symbolize revolt, youth and life. She is very pretty and highly concerned about her looks. She runs away from the family, presumably with a lover.

Unni, according to Gopalkrishnan, is given a mixture of all three colours- white. He is stifled with losing the status he grew up with and incapable of negotiating the changing outer world.

The feudal characteristics of the patriarchy is shown through the way Unni treats his servants, the various people who visit him and most importantly how he treats his sisters. Especially, Rajamma, who takes care of him. The music is throbbing, incomplete throughout the movie to show the sense of sustained urgency, that the crippling patriarchal structure results in (symbolized by the crippling mansion which is infested with rats). As the rats are caught and drowned; Unni is eventually destroyed by the decline of the feudal way of life.

Cast
Karamana Janardanan Nair as Unni
 Sharada as Rajamma
 Jalaja as Sreedevi
 Rajam K Nair as Janamma
prakash

Awards
The film has won the following awards since its release:

1982 Kerala State Film Awards (India) 
 Won - Kerala State Film Award for Best Film - Elippathayam - Adoor Gopalakrishnan

1982 London Film Festival (UK) 
 Won - Sutherland Trophy - Elippathayam - Adoor Gopalakrishnan

1982 National Film Awards (India) 
 Won - Silver Lotus Award - Best Audiography
 Won - Silver Lotus Award - Best Regional Film (Malayalam) - Elippathayam - Adoor Gopalakrishnan'''

References

External links

 Mathrubhumi article

1981 films
1981 drama films
Films shot in Kollam
Films directed by Adoor Gopalakrishnan
1980s Malayalam-language films
Films that won the Best Audiography National Film Award
Best Malayalam Feature Film National Film Award winners
1982 drama films
1982 films